Stefan Andriopoulos (* 1968) is the author of Ghostly Apparitions: German Idealism, the Gothic Novel, and Optical Media (Zone Books 2013). His previous book Possessed: Hypnotic Crimes, Corporate Fiction, and the Invention of Cinema (University of Chicago Press 2008) was awarded the Society for Literature, Science, and the Arts' 2009 Michelle Kendrick Award for best academic book on science, literature, and the arts. Andriopoulos is professor of German in the Department of Germanic Languages at Columbia University.
He has held visiting professorships at Harvard University, in the Department of the History of Science, and at Cologne University, in the Research Institute "Media, Culture, Communication." His academic focus is on media history and intersections of literature and science.
Stefan Andriopoulos is also a recipient of the Columbia Distinguished Faculty Award.

External links 
 Columbia Faculty Website

Living people
Columbia University faculty
Harvard University staff
Year of birth missing (living people)